Vaduvur/Vaduvoor is a Tamil village situated between Thanjavur and Mannargudi in Tamil Nadu State. Vaduvur is divided into three Punjayat for administrative convenience along the area known as  '"தன்னரசு நாடு"'(tannarasu country).

Bird sanctuary
Vaduvoor Bird Sanctuary is located near Mannargudi in Tiruvarur District.

Nearly 20,000 birds visited the lake this season i.e., from October to February. Nearly 38 species of birds have been spotted. The birds that visit the lake every year are the Open bill stork, Cattle egret, Little egret, Pelicans, Grey Pelicans, Darter, Little Cormorants, Common coots, Little tern, Pond heron, Night heron, Painted stork, Common keat, Kingfisher and so forth. The birds are best viewed between 5.30 a.m. to 6.30 a.m., and between 5.30 p.m. to 6.30 p.m.

Hatcheries produce katla, mirgal, and rogue fish primarily to support the agriculture industry where they are transferred to on-growing systems i.e. fish farms to reach harvest size.

Main temple in Vaduvur
Vaduvur Sri Kothandaramaswamy Temple also known as Dakshina Ayodhya is situated at the banks of a Bird Sanctuary and close to a tributary of Cauvery. The main deity, Lord Rama is known for his enchanting and enigmatic beauty. 
 
Vaduvur Sri Kailasanathar swamy temple is one of the famous temple in vaduvur and also it is one of west facing lord Siva temple.and the famous AASAI temple in vaduvur Vadapathi.

References

Villages in Tiruvarur district